The Cahn–Hilliard equation (after John W. Cahn and John E. Hilliard) is an equation of mathematical physics which describes the process of phase separation, by which the two components of a binary fluid spontaneously separate and form domains pure in each component.  If  is the concentration of the fluid, with  indicating domains, then the equation is written as

Additionally, the quantity  is identified as a chemical potential.

Related to it is the Allen–Cahn equation, as well as the stochastic Cahn–Hilliard Equation and the stochastic Allen–Cahn equation.

Features and applications

Of interest to mathematicians is the existence of a unique solution of the Cahn–Hilliard equation, given by smooth initial data.  The proof relies essentially on the existence of a Lyapunov functional.  Specifically, if we identify

as a free energy functional, then

so that the free energy does not grow in time.  This also indicates segregation into domains is the asymptotic outcome of the evolution of this equation.

In real experiments, the segregation of an initially mixed binary fluid into domains is observed.  The segregation is characterized by the following facts.

 There is a transition layer between the segregated domains, with a profile given by the function  and hence a typical width  because this function is an equilibrium solution of the Cahn–Hilliard equation.
 Of interest also is the fact that the segregated domains grow in time as a power law.  That is, if  is a typical domain size, then .  This is the Lifshitz–Slyozov law, and has been proved rigorously for the Cahn–Hilliard equation and observed in numerical simulations and real experiments on binary fluids.
Thus the phase separation process conserves the total concentration , so that .
 When one phase is significantly more abundant, the Cahn–Hilliard equation can show the phenomenon known as Ostwald ripening, where the minority phase forms spherical droplets, and the smaller droplets are absorbed through diffusion into the larger ones.

The Cahn–Hilliard equations finds applications in diverse fields: in complex fluids and soft matter (interfacial fluid flow, polymer science and in industrial applications). The solution of the Cahn–Hilliard equation for a binary mixture demonstrated to coincide well with the solution of a Stefan problem and the model of Thomas and Windle. Of interest to researchers at present is the coupling of the phase separation of the Cahn–Hilliard equation to the Navier–Stokes equations of fluid flow.

See also
 Allen–Cahn equation
 Spinodal decomposition

Further reading 

 
 
 
 
 
 T. Ursell, “Cahn–Hilliard Kinetics and Spinodal Decomposition in a Diffuse System,” California Institute of Technology (2007).

References 

Equations of fluid dynamics
Partial differential equations
Equations